Ettinghausen may refer to:

 Ettinghausen, Germany, Westerwaldkreis, Rhineland-Palatinate
 Richard Ettinghausen (1906–1979), German Jewish historian of Islamic art and chief curator of the Freer Gallery
 Walter Eytan (born Ettinghausen, 1910–2001), Israeli diplomat
 Maurice Sachs (born Ettinghausen, 1906–1945), French Jewish writer

See also 
 Ettingshausen (disambiguation)
 

Jewish surnames
Yiddish-language surnames